Aphrissa is a genus of butterflies in the family Pieridae found in Central and South America.

Species
Listed alphabetically:
Aphrissa boisduvalii (C. & R. Felder, 1861) – Boisduval's sulphur (Mexico to Peru)
Aphrissa fluminensis (d'Almeida, 1921) – Rio de Janeiro sulphur (Costa Rica, Brazil, Peru)
Aphrissa godartiana (Swainson, 1821) – Godart's sulphur (Hispaniola, Jamaica)
Aphrissa neleis (Boisduval, 1836) – pink-spot sulphur (Caribbean)
Aphrissa orbis (Poey, 1832) – orbed sulphur, orbis sulphur (Caribbean)
Aphrissa schausi (Avinoff, 1926) – Schaus' sulphur (Mexico, Guatemala)
Aphrissa statira (Cramer, [1777]) – statira sulphur, pale sulphur (Florida to Mexico, Caribbean)
Aphrissa wallacei (C. & R. Felder, 1862) – Wallace's sulphur (Costa Rica to Argentina)

References

External links
Aphrissa

Coliadinae
Pieridae of South America
Pieridae genera
Taxa named by Arthur Gardiner Butler